Nshan Sergeyevich Galustyan (born 25 October 1979), known professionally as Mikhail Galustyan, is a Russian showman, comedian, screenwriter, and producer. Mikhail Galustyan was also a former participant in KVN and a show called Comedy Club. Awards Champion League KVN 2003, Winner of the Summer Cup of KVN 2004, 2005, 2009.

Biography 
Mikhail Galustyan was born in the resort town of Sochi, Krasnodar Krai, Russian SFSR, Soviet Union in southern Russia. Galusyan's ethnology roots back to the city of Trabzon in modern Turkey, which used to be populated by a large Armenian community. His paternal grandfather, along with his 12 siblings escaped the Armenian Genocide during the early years of the 20th century and moved to Sochi, what was a Black Sea coastal town in the Russian Empire. Galustyan's mother originates from Armenia. Being ethnically Armenian, Galustyan is of Hemshin origin, a branch of the ethnic Armenians who in the past or present have been affiliated with the Hemşin district in the province of Rize, Turkey. 
When Galustyan was in kindergarten he participated in activities such as singing, dancing, and reciting poems. During his early life, Galustyan attended Sochi school, where he practiced the piano and began to hone his skills in a music class. He was also engaged in the puppet theater in the judo section at the Palace of Pioneers. After the fifth grade, Galustyan transferred schools at his parents' instigation. At his new school he performed in a play on the stage.  Galustyan's role in the play was Winnie-the-Pooh. By the time Galustyan was in the 10th grade, he had joined his school's KVN. Eventually, Galustyan became the captain of the school's KVN team. His team went on to defeat all their opponent schools during the regionals and won in СГУТиКД (Sochi State University of Tourism and Resort Business).

In 1996, Galustyan graduated from school and went into medical school, where he had studied to be an "assistant-obstetrician". After graduating from college, Galustyan entered the Sochi State University of Tourism and Resort Business with a focus in Social Pedagogy. In 1998, Galustyan joined his university's "Start" KVN team and took part in the Voronezh League, in which he helped the team reach the finals. After the performances in Voronezh, the team received an invitation to the Highest League for KVN in Moscow from A. V. Maslyakov. Galustyan was eventually expelled from the institute for serious lapse in attendance as his group was on tour and were performing up to three shows per day.

In 2002, Galustyan became the leader of the team, "Baked by the sun". In 2003, the team won that season's championship. During this time, Galustyan also met his future wife, Victoria. And in 2004, "Burnt by the sun" won the KVN Summer cup and repeated this success in both 2005 and 2009.

 Galustyan has participated in the sketch comedy show Nasha Russia (channel TNT) since 2006. 5 seasons have been released.
 Galustyan took part in the TV show Ледниковый период ("Ice Age") on the Perviy Kanal, in pair with Maria Petrova and Elena Berezhnaya
 Galustyan starred in a series of advertisements for "Orion Choco pie".
 Galustyan starred in a series of advertisements for Baskin Robbins ice cream.
 Galustyan is one of the Judges in the reality competition TV program Humor the comedian. (Рассмеши комика) on TV channel "Inter" (Ukraine).

In 2011, Mikhail became a student of the Kutafin Moscow State Law University.

Galustyan was a torchbearer for the 2014 Winter Olympics in his hometown of Sochi. He participated on the last day of the torch relay from Olympia to Sochi in what has been recognized as the largest and longest relay in the history of the Winter Olympics. Galustyan stated, "I'm proud and delighted that I helped my country and my hometown Sochi welcome the 22nd Winter Olympic games."

Sanctions 
In February 2023 Canada sanctioned Mikhail Galustyan for being involved in Russian propaganda and spreading misinformation relating to the 2022 war in Ukraine.

Awards 
 1995 - the Champion of KVN Sochi
 1996 - the Premium "For acting" Moscow
 1998 - Award "Ovation", Saint-Petersburg
 1999 - Prize "Overcome!" Moscow
 2000 - Prize "For hard work" Moscow
 2003 - Champion of the Highest league of KVN Moscow
 2008 - the Cup of "the Legend of KVN" Moscow
 2008 - Was nominated in the "MTV Russia Movie Awards" for the best comedy role, but the award has not received
 2009 - Summer cup of KVN "In the style of a Retro" (Sochi)

Filmography 
 2006 Spanish voyage of Stepanycha as Yanychar
 2008 The Best Movie as «Polkilo»
 2008 Hitler goes Kaput! as guerrilla Rabinovich
 2008 Kung Fu Panda as Po (Russian dubbing-in)
 2009 The Best Movie 2 as :ru:Екатерина II
 2010 Our Russia. The Balls of Fate as Ravshan / «Beard» / Dimon / Alyona (friend of the bride)
 2011 Zaytsev+1 as Feodor (main role)
 2011 Kung Fu Panda 2 as Po (Russian dubbing-in)
 2011 Pregnant as Zhora
 2012 Rzhevsky versus Napoleon as Marquis de Mazo-sad
 2012 That still Karlosson! as Karlsson
 2014 8 New Dates as Timur
 2015 A Warrior's Tail as Semi-Baron Fafl (voice)
 2015 Brigadier as Kesha Black
 2017 Kolobanga as Trojan (voice)
 2022 Summer Time: Travel Back as Sergey Sergeyevich Kurochkin

Television 
 2006 — Nasha Russia — various roles (see below)
 2007 — Happy Together — cameo
 Lednikoviy Period (2008, 2009, 2 and 3 seasons)
 Prozhektorperiskhilton (2008)
 :ru:Рассмеши комика (since 2011)
 :ru:Стенка на стенку (2008)
 Kto khochet stat' millionerom? (Who Wants to become a Millionaire) (2010)
 :ru:Пока все дома (2008)
 Bolshie gonki (2008)
 Comedy Club (since 2006)
 :ru:Кино в деталях (2010)

Roles in Nasha Russia 
 Ravshan - Tajik builder (Moscow & Sochi)
 Ludwig Aristarchovich - concierge, (St. Petersburg)
 Eugene (Gennady) Mikhailovich Kishelskiy - the trainer of Omsk football clubs ГазМяс (GazMyas, lit. means Gas Meat) and later, of the women's club ГазМясочка (GazMyasochka)
 Mikhalich - the shop chief of pipe-rolling plant No.69 (Chelyabinsk) - in the first season, his name was Igor Mikhalich, in the 2nd and 3rd season Alexey, and in the 4th his name was Victor Mikhailovich Oreshkin.
 Dimon - teenager (Krasnodar)
 Anastasia Kuznetsova - the waitress at the sushi bar (Ivanovo). In the film, the character is named Alena.
 Gavrilov - inspector of traffic police on the Penza-Kopeysk highway
 Victor Haritonovich Mamonov - Duma representative of Nefteskvazhinsk (a fictional town)
 Boroda ("beard") - tramp (Rublyovka)
 Zhorik Vartanov - presenter on the "Sev-Kav TV" (Pyatigorsk)
 Egor Sergeevich Dronov - major of militia (Ust-Kuzminsk, fictional town in Krasnoyarsk Krai)
 Vovan is a tourist from Nizhny Tagil visiting Turkey
 Alexander Rodionovich Borodach - a former security guard of Kseniya Sobchak (Ryazan).
 Valera - neighbor of Sergei Belyakov (Taganrog).
 Vasiliy - fan of football club "Neva" (Saint-Petersburg).

References

External links 

 
 
 Подробная биография Михаила Галустяна
 Светлый и Тёмный из «Нашей Russia»: Светлаков и Галустян
 Михаил Галустян: Из «Нашей Russia», с любовью…
 Интервью с Михаилом Галустяном
 Михаил Галустян at ruskino.ru
 Михаил Галустян в рекламе
 КВН.ру Игры с участием Михаила Галустяна на Портале КВН
 Зайцев+1 новый сериал с Михаилом в главной роли
 Биография Михаила Галустяна

 Mikhail Galustyan at the Forbes

1979 births
Living people
People from Sochi
Russian male comedians
Russian people of Armenian descent
Abkhaz Armenians
KVN
Russian male film actors
Russian male voice actors
Russian male television actors
21st-century Russian male actors
Russian screenwriters
Russian film producers
Russian television presenters